Sarayevo (Haray) is a rural locality (a selo) in Truntaishevsky Selsoviet, Alsheyevsky District, Bashkortostan, Russia. The population was 342 as of 2010. There are 7 streets.

Geography 
Sarayevo is located 32 km west of Rayevsky (the district's administrative centre) by road. Irik is the nearest rural locality.

References 

Rural localities in Alsheyevsky District